Richard Nestus Gurley (March 27, 1897 – August 8, 1976) was an American football, basketball and baseball coach.

He served as the head football coach at Lenoir–Rhyne University in Hickory, North Carolina from 1924 to 1931. He served as the school's head basketball and baseball coach.

As a college football player, he was a starting quarterback at North Carolina State University.

References

External links
 

1897 births
1976 deaths
American football quarterbacks
Lenoir–Rhyne Bears baseball coaches
Lenoir–Rhyne Bears football coaches
Lenoir–Rhyne Bears men's basketball coaches
NC State Wolfpack football players